The 1878 Alabama gubernatorial election took place on August 5, 1878, in order to elect the governor of Alabama. Democrat Rufus W. Cobb ran unopposed.

Results

References

1878
gubernatorial
Alabama
August 1878 events